Mr & Mrs 420 Returns is an Indian-Punjabi comedy film directed by Ksshitij Chaudhary starring Ranjit Bawa, Jassi Gill, Payal Rajput, Karamjit Anmol, Jaswinder Bhalla & Gurpreet Ghuggi. It is sequel to the film Mr & Mrs 420 which was released in 2014. Film was released on 15 August 2018.

Cast

 Ranjit Bawa
 Jassi Gill
 Payal Rajput as Dr. Seerat
 Avantika Hundal
 Jaswinder Bhalla
 Karamjit Anmol
 Gurpreet Ghuggi

Soundtrack

Track List

Reception

The Times of India gave the film a rating of 3.5 out of 5. Reviewer Jaspreet Nijher appreciates the direction work of Ksshitij Chaudhary.

Jasmine Singh of The Tribune also rated the film as 3.5 out of 5. Reviewer appreciates the way drug issue is raised in film. Reviewer also appreciates the whole cast of the film. In last added, "The drug problem in Punjab might take some time to solve but till then the film gives an all new perspective on it, one that can be laughed about without undermining the seriousness of the issue."

References

External links
 

Punjabi-language Indian films
Indian comedy films
Indian sequel films